Strangelove: The Depeche Mode Experience, or Strangelove is an American tribute act formed in 2010, reproducing the music of Depeche Mode. The name of the band comes from Depeche Mode's song of the same name.

The band was included in LA Weekly's "The 20 Best Tribute Acts in Los Angeles" in 2015

Strangelove is featured in an episode in the first season of E!'s Clash of the Cover Bands.

The band has headlined in greater than 7,000 seat venues. In addition to many cities across the United States, Strangelove has performed in Mexico, Canada, Italy, Australia, New Zealand, Chile, Ecuador, Dominican Republic, and Depeche Mode's native England.

Lineup

Current

 Leo Luganskiy as “Ultra-Dave” performing lead vocals in the style of Dave Gahan
 Brent Meyer as “Counterfeit Martin” performing synthesizer, guitar and vocals in the style of Martin Gore
 Julian Shah-Tayler as “Oscar Wilder” performing keyboards as Alan Wilder
 James Evans as "In The Fletch" performing keyboards as Andy Fletcher
 Chris Olivas as "Chris-tian O-gner performing drums (occasional)

Former
 Brian Johnson as "In The Fletch" (Andrew Fletcher)

 Jake Jordan as “In The Fletch” (Andrew Fletcher)

 Freddie Morales as "Devotional Dave" (Dave Gahan)

 David Sepe as “Alan Wildest” (Alan Wilder)

References

External links
 
 Strangelove on YouTube

Tribute bands